Maharshi Mehi Paramhans is a saint in the tradition of Sant Mat, widely worshipped by people in Nepal , India and other foreign nations too. He was usually known as 'Gurumaharaj'. He was the guru of 'Akhil Bhartiye Santmat Satsang'. He studied Vedas, main Upanishads, the Bhagavad Gita, the Bible, different sutras of Buddhism, the Quran, saint's literature and from this assessed that the essential teaching contained in all of these is one and the same. He gave one and easiest method to get 'Moksha'. They are 'Satsang' and 'Dhyan'(Meditation). Mehi was a direct disciple of Baba Devi Sahab of Muradabad, Uttar Pradesh.

Early life 
He studied from early age alone and then with Baba Devi Sahab, in 1909. As directed by his teacher, Mehi spent many years in intense meditation in an ashram located in Manihari of the Katihar district.

Life 
His grandmother's home was in Shikli garh Dharahara, Banmankhi, in the Purnia district. There was a cave in which he used to go there for meditation. His father was called Babujan Lal Das.

The family astrologer named him Ramanugrah Lal Das based on his astrological charts, a name that is also found in Mehi's school records. His adopted name Mehi means lean and thin and also sharp or subtle. About two decades later when Ramanugrah La Das came into contact with his guru, Baba Devi Sahab, the latter, impressed by his exceptionally sharp intellect, also started calling him "Mehi".

Mehi's mother, Janakwati Devi, died when he was four years old. His elder sister was very kind to him and she and his father took very good care of him. He was admitted to the village school when he turned eight. At this school, learning was imparted in the local Kaithi script. At home he saw his father reciting regularly from the great epic the Ramcharitmanas composed by the poet Sant Goswami Tulsidas Ji. His father often turned very emotional while reciting and at times burst into tears. This made Mehi curious to know the contents of the epic. As the epic was printed in the Devanagari script he could not read it at first. However, he labored to correlate the alphabets of Devanagri from those of Kaithi and soon he could learn Devanagri script as well. The Ram charit manas left a deep impact on his mind and several of its quartets and couplets became known to him by heart. He also learned English, Urdu, and Persian languages at secondary school.

In his childhood days, Maharshi Mehi Paramhans was a worshipper of Lord Shiva, but his method of worshipping was unique: he would drive a nail into the ground, make it an offering of water and then sit in its front in meditation. As a teenager, he was a very good soccer player. Impressed with his skills at dabbling the ball, his friends made him the team captain. However, very soon he began to lose interest in playing as well as formal studies even as he developed an intense fondness for the study of religious scriptures like the Sukhsagar and the Mahabharat apart from the Ramcharitmanas. He would very often retire into solitude while his friends were busy playing to study these books. His disinterest in schooling and formal studies kept waxing progressively and reached its climax on 3 July 1904. Half-yearly exams of Class X were on and it was the second paper – English. The first question read: "Quote from memory the poem ‘Builders’ and explain it in your own English." Answering the question, he quoted the first four lines, as reproduced below, and began to explain these. The lines of the poem were:

"For the structure that we raise,
time is with material's field,
our todays and yesterdays,
are the blocks with which we build." - Maharshi Mehi

While explaining the central message of the above lines he got overwhelmed with such a strong surge of the emotion of renunciation that he stood up and asked the invigilator, "May I go out, Sir?" Thinking that he wanted to go to the toilet, the invigilator granted the permission but little did he know that this young lad was not merely going out of the examination hall briefly but had decided to bid adieu to the very household life for good. In fact, Mehi had made already three unsuccessful attempts to flee home, but this time his determination was rock solid and he was never to look back again.

Gurus 
Baba Devi Sahab was the main spiritual Guru of Mehi. However, before he met Baba Devi Sahab, his intense yearning for true emancipation led him to three other gurus (spiritual teachers).

Per family tradition, Mehi was initiated by Mr. Ram Jha, a Brahmin priest from Darbhanga district of the state of Bihar, in 1902. Mr. Jha was a worshipper of Lord Shiva and Mother Goddess Kali and was very fond of hunting. He, in his later years, lost his eyesight and just had a feeling that this (loss of vision) was the consequence of his previous acts of killing birds & animals. He, therefore, preached Mehi never to commit violence.

Ramanand Swami, a sadhu of Dariyapanth (a sect named after Sant Dariya Sahab of Bihar), was Mehi's second guru. Ramanand Swami taught Mehi to practice 'Manas Jap' (internally chanting or repeatedly reciting a sacred mantra), 'Manas Dhyan' (trying to concentrate internally on the form of a sacred deity or Guru) and 'Bahya Drishti Sadahan' (stilling gaze at a target in the outside, not within ). However, through a study of saintly literature and relevant spiritual Scriptures Mehi had come to realize that the knowledge of Sound/Word Meditation (Surat Shabda Yoga) was a must for total liberation – a domain Ramanand Swami was not conversant with. Curious questioning about the 'sara shabda'(Quintessential Unstruck Sound) by Mehi often irritated or even infuriated his guru Ramanand Swami Ji which left Mehi dissatisfied and fully convinced that he would have to find another suitable guru. He, thus, remained restless and on the lookout for a complete Guru. He would rush to several places wherever he heard of the possibility of seeing a person who could guide him in Sound Meditation.

It was his incessant search, that was far and wide, that led Mehi to a disciple of Baba Devi Sahab named Mr. Dhiraj Lal from Jotramrai, the very same village where Mehi had been staying in attendance upon Ramanand Swami. Mehi was deeply satisfied with the clarifications offered by Mr. Dhiraj Lal on many topics that had been puzzling Mehi for a long time. It was difficult to find free time during the day for he had to attend to various duties instructed by his erstwhile guru. So, after getting free from his duties towards Ramanand Swami Ji in the night he would approach Mr. Dhiraj Lal and the two had absorbing discussions from midnight to about 3 AM and this went on for about three months (May – July 1909) till Mehi became finally convinced that he had landed in the right spot and that Baba Devi Sahab was indeed the true Guru he had been looking for. However, since Baba Devi Sahab lived at Moradabad of U.P., Mr. Dhiraj Lal advised Mehi to approach, in the meanwhile, and have initiation from Mr. Rajendra Nath Singh of Bhagalpur, a place that was relatively nearer. Mr. Rajendra Nath, an initiate of Baba Devi Sahab, was an advocate by profession. He had some preliminary discussions with Mehi and saw in him a genuine seeker thirsting for freedom from the bondage of BMI (Body-Mind-Intellect-Ego Complex). He gladly gave initiation to Mehi, teaching him the art of 'drishti sadhan'(the Yoga of Inner Light – a technique to still one's gaze in the inner sky in front of the center of the two eyes, called variously as the Sushumna, Sukhamana, the Ajna Chakra, the Third Eye, the Tenth Door, the Shiva Netra etc.) aimed at transcending the Gross Sphere, the Realm of Darkness and, thus, moving into the Realm of Light, the Astral Plane. As the grateful Mehi tried to touch Mr. Rajendra Nath's feet in reverence, the latter forcibly stopped him and told, "Look, I am not your Guru. I have only explained you the method as authorised by Sadguru Baba Devi Sahab. Baba Devi Sahab, not I, is your Guru." Mehi replied, "Yes, of course, he is my Guru and your Guru also, but since you have taught me this (drishti Sadahn), you are also like my Guru." Thus, Mr. Rajendra Nath Singh may be treated to be his third Guru.

After having been initiated into Santmat and becoming fully satisfied, Mehi, as advised by his friends, returned to where his father (who became ecstatic to see his son back home) lived and waited to see Baba Devi Sahab. The momentous occasion finally came during the festival of Dashahara (celebrated generally in October) when Baba Devi Sahab arrived at Bhagalpur. When Mr. Dhiraj Lal informed Mehi of the programme of Baba Devi Sahab's visit to Bhagalpur, Mehi got excited like a child and rushed to see his Guru. It was on the auspicious day of Vijayadashami of 1909 that he got to have his first glimpse of his Guru – a true Guru had got a true disciple and successor who was to take Santmat to the dizzier pinnacles of glory.

Literature 

List of Books Authored by or About Maharshi Mehi Paramhans:
 Moksha Darshan (Philosophy of Liberation), Translated into English from Hindi by Professor Veena Howard, University of Oregon Eugene
 Excerpt of the Biography of Maharshi Mehi in English
 Santmat-Siddhant aur Guru-Kirtan
 Satsang Yoga (Part I – IV)
 Ramcharitmanas Sar Sateek
 Vinay-Patrika Sar Sateek
 Bhavarth-Sahit Ghat Ramayan Padavali
 Mehi Padavali
 Satsang Sudha, Part I
 Satsang Sudha, Part II
 Shri Gita Yoga Prakash
 Veda Darshan Yoga
 Ishwara Swaroop aur Usaki Prapti
 Santvani Sateek
 Jnana Yoga Yukta Ishwara Bhakti

Notes 

Sant Mat gurus
1885 births
1986 deaths
People from Bhagalpur
People from Saharsa district